Eilesium or Eilesion was a town of ancient Boeotia. It is mentioned by Homer in the Catalogue of Ships in the Iliad. Strabo says that its name indicates a marshy position.

Its site is located near modern Asopia/Khlembotsari.

References

Populated places in ancient Boeotia
Former populated places in Greece
Locations in the Iliad